"Rotterdam (Or Anywhere)" is a song by English pop rock music group the Beautiful South, taken from their fifth studio album, Blue Is the Colour (1996). It features Jacqui Abbott on lead vocals. Released in September 1996, the song reached number five on the UK Singles Chart and stayed in the UK top 40 for nine weeks.

Background
Paul Heaton told The Guardian: "I wrote the lyrics to Rotterdam (Or Anywhere) sitting in a bar on the north end of Lijnbaan, Rotterdam's main shopping street. The bar was modern-looking and not friendly at all. It was in January 1996, about three in the afternoon. I'd probably been up all night drinking, I probably smelled, and I'd walked into their bar and plonked my bag down. I wasn't the sort the owners wanted in there. They probably thought: 'Oh God, we don't want this bloke to be our regular. Let’s make sure he never comes back.' So they were trying to think of different excuses to move me on, like: 'You can't sit there, there's a private party coming in.' I got really pissed off – and I wrote a short story that became a very bitchy song, scribbling it down while sitting there."

Music video
The music video features Jacqui Abbott walking along an empty British motorway, carrying a vintage Shell fuel can, followed by a series of miscellaneous costumed extras, including a dance troupe, beekeepers, cowboys, a man with a sandwich board, snorkellers and a pantomime cow, with successive groups changing with each verse of the song. Abbott walks on, seemingly oblivious to the following crowd. The rest of the band wait for Abbott while sitting on the back of a vintage blue Chevrolet GMC pick-up truck. Abbott told The Guardian: "The Rotterdam video had a circus theme, and it was filmed on a stretch of disused motorway where they road-tested vehicles. All day, I walked up and down, miming and holding a petrol can, with jugglers and unicyclists behind me. I think the people watching just thought – as we did: 'What the hell is going on?'" Towards the end of the video all of the figures following Abbott give up on the parade with an air of resigned disappointment.

Track listings
UK 7-inch and cassette single
 "Rotterdam"
 "A Minute's Silence"

UK CD single
 "Rotterdam"
 "A Minute's Silence"
 "Pollard"

Personnel
The Beautiful South
 Jacqui Abbott – vocals
 Dave Rotheray – guitar
 Sean Welch – bass
 Dave Stead – drums

Additional musicians 
 Damon Butcher – keyboards, programming, string arrangements
 Martin Ditcham – percussion
 Andy Duncan – percussion, programming

Technical
 John Brough – producer, engineer
 Jon Kelly – producer

Charts

Weekly charts

Year-end charts

Certifications

References

External links
 "Rotterdam" at discogs.com
 "Rotterdam" at 45Cat.com

1996 singles
1996 songs
Go! Discs singles
Songs about cities
Songs about the Netherlands
Songs written by David Rotheray
Songs written by Paul Heaton
The Beautiful South songs